Fall In is a 1942 American comedy film directed by Kurt Neumann and written by Eugene Conrad and Edward E. Seabrook. The film stars William Tracy, Joe Sawyer, Robert Barrat, Jean Porter and Arthur Hunnicutt. The film was released on November 20, 1942, by United Artists.

Plot

Cast  
 William Tracy as Sgt. Dorian 'Dodo' Doubleday
 Joe Sawyer as Sgt. William Ames
 Robert Barrat as Col. Elliott
 Jean Porter as Joan
 Arthur Hunnicutt as Luke Hatfield
 Rebel Randall as Lydia Hummock
 Frank Faylen as Capt. Gillis
 Clyde Fillmore as Arnold Benedict

References

External links 
 

1942 films
1942 comedy films
American comedy films
American black-and-white films
Films directed by Kurt Neumann
Military humor in film
United Artists films
World War II films made in wartime
Films scored by Edward Ward (composer)
1940s English-language films
English-language comedy films